Kim Sung-joo or similar may refer to:

 Kim Il-Sung, founder and first leader of North Korea , who's birth name is Kim Seong-ju
 Kim Sung-joo (entrepreneur) (born 1956), South Korean entrepreneur and businesswoman
 Kim Sung-joo (politician, born 1964), South Korean politician
 Kim Sung-joo (presenter) (born 1972), South Korean former announcer and TV host
 Kim Seong-ju (born 1990), South Korean football midfielder for Ulsan Hyundai
 Kim Sung-joo (entertainer) (born 1994), South Korean singer and member of Uniq
 Kim Seong-joo (born 1998), South Korean football forward for the Jeonnam Dragons